Fox Theatre, St. Louis, MO 12-10-71 is a live album by the Grateful Dead.  As the title suggests, it was recorded at the Fox Theatre in St. Louis, Missouri on December 10, 1971. It was released as a three-disc CD and digitally on October 1, 2021, and as a five-disc LP on November 19, 2021.

The same recording was released on October 8, 2021, as part of the seven-concert, 20-CD box set Listen to the River: St. Louis '71 '72 '73.

At the December 10, 1971 concert, and at the other shows on this tour, the opening act was the New Riders of the Purple Sage.

Track listing 
Disc 1
First set:
"Bertha" (Jerry Garcia, Robert Hunter) – 6:32
"Me and My Uncle" (John Phillips) – 3:48
"Mr. Charlie" (Ron McKernan, Hunter) – 4:25
"Loser" (Garcia, Hunter) – 7:22
"Beat It On Down the Line" (Jesse Fuller) – 3:49
"Sugaree" (Garcia, Hunter) – 8:49
"Jack Straw" (Bob Weir, Hunter) – 5:30
"Next Time You See Me" (Bill Harvey, Earl Forest) – 4:37
"Tennessee Jed" (Garcia, Hunter) – 7:43
"El Paso" (Marty Robbins) – 4:56
"Big Railroad Blues" (Noah Lewis, arranged by Grateful Dead) – 4:12
"Casey Jones" (Garcia, Hunter) – 5:42
Disc 2
Second set:
"Good Lovin' (Rudy Clark, Arthur Resnick) – 22:12
"Brokedown Palace" (Garcia, Hunter) – 6:06
"Playing in the Band" (Weir, Mickey Hart, Hunter) – 6:57
"Run Rudolph Run" (Johnny Marks, Marvin Brodie) – 3:39
"Deal" (Garcia, Hunter) – 5:50
"Sugar Magnolia" (Weir, Hunter) – 7:54
"Comes a Time" (Garcia, Hunter) – 8:41
Disc 3
"Truckin' (Garcia, Phil Lesh, Weir, Hunter) – 8:09
"Drums" (Bill Kreutzmann) – 3:21
"The Other One" (Weir, Kreutzmann) – 13:13
"Sittin' On Top of the World" (Lonnie Carter, Walter Jacobs) – 3:10
"The Other One" (Weir, Kreutzmann) – 6:02
"Not Fade Away" (Norman Petty, Charles Hardin) – 5:58
"Goin' Down the Road Feeling Bad" (traditional, arranged by Grateful Dead) – 6:13
"Not Fade Away" (Petty, Hardin) – 3:59
Encore:
"One More Saturday Night" (Weir) – 4:52

Personnel 
Grateful Dead
Jerry Garcia – guitar, vocals
Keith Godchaux – keyboards
Bill Kreutzmann – drums
Phil Lesh – bass, vocals
Ron "Pigpen" McKernan – keyboards, harmonica, vocals
Bob Weir – guitar, vocals

Production
Produced by Grateful Dead
Produced for release by David Lemieux
Mastering: Jeffrey Norman
Recording: Rex Jackson
Tape restoration and speed correction: Jamie Howarth, John Chester
Art direction: Rory Wilson, Liane Plant
Original art: Liane Plant
Package design: Rory Wilson
Photos: Bob Marks
Liner notes: Nicholas G. Meriwether

Charts

References 

2021 live albums
Grateful Dead live albums
Rhino Records live albums